Renatus Leonard Nkwande is the Archbishop of the Roman Catholic Archdiocese of Mwanza in Tanzania, incumbent since May 12, 2019.

Biography
Nkwande was born in Mantare,(sumve-Mwanza) Tanzania on November 12, 1965. He attended primary schools in Sumve. In 1981 he joined a Junior Seminary. In 1987 he went to the Kibosho Major Seminary in the Roman Catholic Diocese of Moshi and in 1989 he studied theology in St Charles Lwanga Seminary in Dar-es-Salaam.

On July 2, 1995 he was ordained priest for the Roman Catholic Archdiocese of Mwanza. He studied in Rome for a Licentiate in Canon Law at the Pontifical Urban University between 2002-2005.  Until his appointment, he was the Vicar General and administrator of the Archdiocese of Mwanza.

On November 27, 2010 Renatus Leonard Nkwande was appointed bishop of the newly created Diocese of Bunda. He was ordained a bishop on February 20, 2011.

On February 11, 2019, Nkwande was appointed the Archbishop of the Roman Catholic Archdiocese of Mwanza and officially  resumed office on May 12, 2019.

See also

References

1965 births
Tanzanian Roman Catholic archbishops
Living people
People from Mwanza Region
Pontifical Urban University alumni
Roman Catholic archbishops of Mwanza
Roman Catholic bishops of Bunda